Eastford is a town in Windham County, Connecticut, United States. The population was 1,649 at the 2020 census.

History
Eastford was formed in 1847 when it was broken off from Ashford, Connecticut.  The name "Eastford" is locational, for the town is east of Ashford.

Geography

Principal communities
Phoenixville—A 1930s book describes it as "a small crossroads hamlet on Still River, which grew up around a twine mill (1831), now abandoned."
East Phoenixville
North Ashford

On the National Register of Historic Places

 Benjamin Bosworth House – John Perry Rd. (added 1978)
 Natchaug Forest Lumber Shed – Kingsbury Rd., Natchaug State Forest (added 1986)
 Sumner-Carpenter House – 333 Old Colony Rd. (added 1991)
 Union Society of Phoenixville House – 4 Hartford Turnpike. (added 2007)

Demographics

At the 2000 census there were 1,618 people, 618 households, and 451 families living in the town. There were 705 housing units at an average density of 24.4 per square mile (9.4/km). The racial makeup of the town was 97.78% White, 0.43% African American, 0.19% Native American, 0.37% Asian, 0.31% from other races, and 0.93% from two or more races. Hispanic or Latino of any race were 1.36%.

There were 618 households, out of which
100 have children under the age of 18 living with them, 63.1% were married couples living together, 6.1% had a female householder with no husband present, and 27.0% were non-families. 21.8% of households were one person, and 9.1% were one person aged 65 or older.  The average household size was 2.62 and the average family size was 3.06.

The age distribution was 26.3% under the age of 18, 5.6% from 18 to 24, 29.2% from 25 to 44, 25.4% from 45 to 64, and 13.4% 65 or older.  The median age was 39 years. For every 100 females, there were 103.0 males.  For every 100 females age 18 and over, there were 101.0 males.

The median household income was $57,159 and the median family income was $62,031. Males had a median income of $45,000 versus $31,964 for females. The per capita income for the town was $25,364.  About 4.4% of families and 6.0% of the population were below the poverty line, including 10.0% of those under age 18 and 3.7% of those age 65 or over.

Eastford is a strongly Republican town. The town has voted for the Republican candidate every time since the 1856 election and since its founding in 1847 has never voted for a Democrat for president, the only town in Connecticut with this distinction. Even during President Lyndon B. Johnson's landslide in 1964, Eastford voters still preferred Barry Goldwater, the Republican candidate, by a comfortable 11.2% margin. Since 1992, however, the Democratic candidate has been more competitive. President Barack Obama only lost to Mitt Romney by 1 vote in 2012.

Education
Residents are zoned to the Eastford School District for grades Preschool through 8. The only school in the district is Eastford Elementary School. Most high schoolers attend Woodstock Academy. The town is near five alternative high schools: Ellis Vocational Technical School, Windham Technical School, Killingly Vocational Agricultural High School, ACT High School, and Quinebaug Middle College.

Notable people

 Andrew T. Judson (1784–1853), United States federal judge and US Congressman
 Nathaniel Lyon (1818–1861), the first Union General to be killed in the Civil War is buried here in his family plot

Trivia
There was another Eastford in the state which was renamed East Windsor shortly after its separation from Windsor.

Eastford is the site of Frog Rock, a rest stop and roadside attraction on U.S. Route 44.

References

External links

Town government Web site

 
Towns in Windham County, Connecticut
Towns in Connecticut